"Get Here" is a pop ballad written by American singer and songwriter Brenda Russell. The title track of her fourth studio album, Get Here (1988), it became a moderate hit on the Billboard R&B chart on the heels of the album's massive first hit, "Piano in the Dark". American vocalist Oleta Adams covered and released the song in 1990, reaching the top five in both the US and the UK with her version. Adams's version of "Get Here", co-produced by Roland Orzabal from the band Tears for Fears (for whom she had performed the female vocals on the hit single "Woman in Chains" a year earlier), became her signature song.

Composition and first release
Brenda Russell had written the song while staying at a penthouse in Stockholm: the tune came to her as she viewed some hot air balloons floating over the city, a sight Russell recalls set her "really tripping on how many ways you can get to a person" (the eventual song's lyrics include the line: "You can make it in a big balloon but you'd better make it soon"). Although Russell did not pursue the musical ideas that came to her as her current record label saw her as a dance artist and she thought would not be interested in a song such as the one which became "Get Here", the song was still in the singer's mind when she woke up the next day: "I don't read or write music [so] it's extraordinary if a song is still in my head that I haven't jotted down or recorded. So if it's still in my head overnight, I think that's something extra special, it's like somebody trying to tell me something." Russell recorded the song as the title cut of her 1988 album from which it was issued as a single - the album's third - reaching number 37 on the Billboard R&B chart.

Oleta Adams version

In 1991, American singer Oleta Adams released her cover of "Get Here", which was taken from her 1990 album, Circle of One. It was while Adams was visiting Stockholm, Sweden that she heard Russell's song playing in a record store and was sufficiently impressed with the song to record it for her album. Adams's version of "Get Here" was issued as a single in early 1991. World events at this time gave the song a resonance as an anthem for the US troops in the Gulf War—underscored by the lyrics "You can reach me by caravan / Cross the desert like an Arab man"—which sent Adams's single into the top ten of the Billboard Hot 100 in the spring of 1991.

Critical reception
"Get Here" received favorable reviews from most music critics. AllMusic editor Stephen Thomas Erlewine described the song as a "gospel-tinged belter". Larry Flick from Billboard stated that "delicate instrumental arrangement contrasts with Adams' powerful reading of a lovely Brenda Russell composition." The Commercial Appeal picked it as a "standout" track from the album and described it as "magnificent". Karla Peterson from Copley News Service called it "warmhearted". A reviewer from The Daily Telegraph said it is "the Single of the week, the year, the decade..." Ellen Fagg from The Deseret News wrote that it's a "stunning love song-cum-transportation commercial". She noted that the lyrics "are creative and witty and plaintively passionate, a difficult triple combination to score. But the words are great because they're underlined by the rich power of Adams' big voice."

James Bernard from Entertainment Weekly viewed it as "an unrushed call to her lover" and noted that the singer's voice "can soar with intensity, hanging onto notes for dear life, or suddenly drop into hushed intimacy." A reviewer from Los Angeles Times picked it as "one of the year's most satisfying hit singles." Stephen Holden from New York Times declared it as a "ballad of separation and longing", while Philadelphia Daily News noted it as "that come-home-safe song widely connected to our troops in the gulf war." Nick Duerden from Record Mirror wrote, "With few singers capable of matching her eloquent tones (Anita Baker excepted), 'Get Here', a wondrous three-minute love affair with the senses, is destined to scale deserving heights." Caroline Sullivan from Smash Hits labeled it as a "wistful souly ballad" from the former Tears For Fears backing singer. Tonya Pendleton from Vibe called it "anthemic".

Chart performance
"Get Here" was a major hit in both Europe and the US, reaching the Top 5 in Ireland, the United Kingdom and the US. In the UK, the single peaked at number four on February 17, 1991, after 7 weeks on the UK Singles Chart. Additionally, it also reached the Top 20 in Poland and Top 30 in the Netherlands. On the Eurochart Hot 100, "Get Here" peaked at number nine in March. Outside Europe, it went to number 27 in Canada and number five on the US Billboard Hot 100.

Music video
The music video for "Get Here" begins outside a red wall with a blue door and window. After a while, Adams is seen in front, before she is seen sitting and playing by a piano. As she begins to sing, she is back in front of the wall. Other scenes show the singer singing in a blue-green room with a white window. In some scenes she also stands in a corner. Later in the video, Adams is seen in front of the red wall, now apparently inside and in front of one window. The video concludes with a close-up of Adams against the blue-green wall as she sings the last lines of the song.

Track listings

Charts

Weekly charts

Year-end charts

Release history

Other versions
An uptempo cover version was released in the UK in 1993 by the dance act Q featuring Tracy Ackerman and reached number 37 in the UK Top 40.
A signature number of Justin Guarini during season one of American Idol and included on the Justin Guarini album.
"Get Here" has also been recorded by Vanessa Amorosi, Paul Anka, David Archuleta, Alexia Gardner, Salena Jones, Patti LuPone, Barbara Mandrell, Omar Chakil (who wrote French lyrics for his version: "Tu m'as tout donné"), Jennifer Rush, Livingston Taylor, Siti Nurhaliza, Jonalyn Viray, and Susan Wong.
Also Edsilia Rombley recorded "Get Here" for her 1998 album Edsilia from which it was taken as a single reaching number 88 on the Netherlands charts: previously Rombley had recorded a Dutch rendering of the song entitled "Zorg Dat Je Er Bent" which had appeared on the singer's 1997 Thuis album.
Australian born Irish singer Johnny Logan recorded the song as "Get Here If You Can" for his album, We All Need Love (2003).
A humorous cover of "Get Here", which featured comedy sound effects after each method of transport mentioned, was performed by fictional singer Michelle Coffee in the Peter Kay series Phoenix Nights.
The song was performed by Andy Hallett as his character Lorne on the series Angel, in the season 2 episode "First Impressions".
During American Idols American Juniors, Lucy Hale sang "Get Here" in the top-20 semi-final 2. She was chosen as one of the 5 contestants who advanced to the next competition.
Nils Landgren recorded a cover of the song on his album Chapter Two (2009).
Lulu Roman (of Hee Haw fame) recorded a cover for her 2013 album At Last.
Will Downing covers the song on his album Black Pearls (2016).
Sam Smith recorded a cover for their Spotify Singles release in 2018.
Conchita Wurst recorded a cover for his 2018 album From Vienna with Love.
Renee Cologne covered the song on her 2019 release Coverlings.

The Beautiful South's album Gaze included a song with the same title and, partially, similar lyrics - but reversed the theme, with Paul Heaton protesting his unwillingness to travel any distance at all for his lover. (Sample lyric: "You can get here by helicopter"/"I can barely make Blackpool sands").

References

1980s ballads
1988 singles
1988 songs
1991 singles
A&M Records singles
Brenda Russell songs
Fontana Records singles
Mercury Records singles
Oleta Adams songs
Pop ballads
Songs written by Brenda Russell
Soul ballads